Benson Bluff is a distinctive triangular rock bluff in Antarctica, about  high, at the west side of Ragotzkie Icefall in the Britannia Range. It was named by the Advisory Committee on Antarctic Names after Dale P. Benson, United States Geological Survey cartographer who conducted surveys at South Pole Station, 1993–94, and supported the first airborne GPS controlled photogrammetry project, which established photo control on Black Island and positioned the location of seismographic equipment on the flanks of Mount Erebus.

References
 

Cliffs of Oates Land